The 2002 Cotton Bowl Classic matched the Arkansas Razorbacks and the Oklahoma Sooners.

Background
This was the Sooners first Cotton Bowl Classic appearance ever. The Sooners finished 2nd in the Big 12 South after two crucial losses to Nebraska and Oklahoma State This was the first appearance for the Razorbacks since 2000. Despite finishing 5th in the SEC West, they were invited to this game.

Game summary
Arkansas QBs were sacked nine times by Oklahoma, a school record and tying a Cotton Bowl Classic record. Arkansas could manage only 50 yards of total offense, and one Brennan O'Donohoe field goal late in the game. Oklahoma QB Nate Hybl ran in from one yard out for the only touchdown of the game. Sooner Rocky Calmus, the Butkus Award winner and Nagurski, Bednarik, and Lombardi finalist had nine tackles and a fumble recovery in the effort. Razorback coach Houston Nutt said, "[The Oklahoma defense is] the best I've seen in 15 years.

References

Cotton Bowl Classic
Cotton Bowl Classic
Arkansas Razorbacks football bowl games
Oklahoma Sooners football bowl games
Cotton Bowl
January 2002 sports events in the United States
2000s in Dallas
2002 in Texas